Gundula "Gundi" Busch (April 29, 1935 – January 31, 2014) was a German figure skater. She was the 1954 World champion, the 1954 European champion, and a two-time West German national champion.

Life and career

Early life 
Gundula Busch was born on April 29, 1935, in Milan, Italy. She was a daughter of a German businessman. The family moved to Harlem, Netherlands in 1944, and later to Garmisch-Partenkirchen, Bavaria, Germany.

Career 
Busch began skating at age four and a half years. She also took ballet classes in Garmisch-Partenkirchen and visited London in 1950 to learn from elite skaters.

Busch was coached by Thea Frenssen. Her skating club was SC Rießersee. She began representing West Germany at major international events in 1951, after becoming the national bronze medalist. In 1952, she was selected to compete at the Winter Olympics in Oslo, Norway; she placed 10th in compulsory figures, sixth in free skating, and 8th overall.

Busch took silver at the 1953 European Championships in Dortmund, finishing second to Valda Osborn of the United Kingdom. At the 1953 World Championships in Davos, she won silver behind Tenley Albright of the United States. 

Busch won gold at the 1954 European Championships in Bolzano, ahead of British skaters Erica Batchelor and Yvonne Sugden. She then outscored Albright and Batchelor for the gold medal at the 1954 World Championships in Oslo. She was the first ladies' single skater representing Germany to become a world champion.

Deciding to end her amateur skating career, Busch accepted an offer from the Hollywood Ice Revue. She performed as a professional skater at New York's Madison Square Garden in 1955.

Later years 
Busch married a Swedish professional ice hockey player, Lill-Lulle Johansson, in 1955. They moved with their son, Peter Lulle Johansson, to Stockholm, Sweden. Busch worked as a figure skating coach in Sweden for many years before retiring in 1997.

Busch died after a prolonged illness at Stockholm's Saint Göran Hospital on January 31, 2014.

Results

References

1935 births
2014 deaths
Figure skaters from Milan
German female single skaters
Figure skaters at the 1952 Winter Olympics
Olympic figure skaters of Germany
World Figure Skating Championships medalists
European Figure Skating Championships medalists
Italian people of German descent